= Hoods to Woods Foundation =

Youth snowboarding program based in New York City

Hoods to Woods Foundation is a nonprofit organization based in New York City that provides free snowboarding programs and outdoor activities for youth. Founded in 2009, the group brings participants from city neighborhoods to mountain resorts where they receive instruction, equipment and supervised time on snow.

== History ==
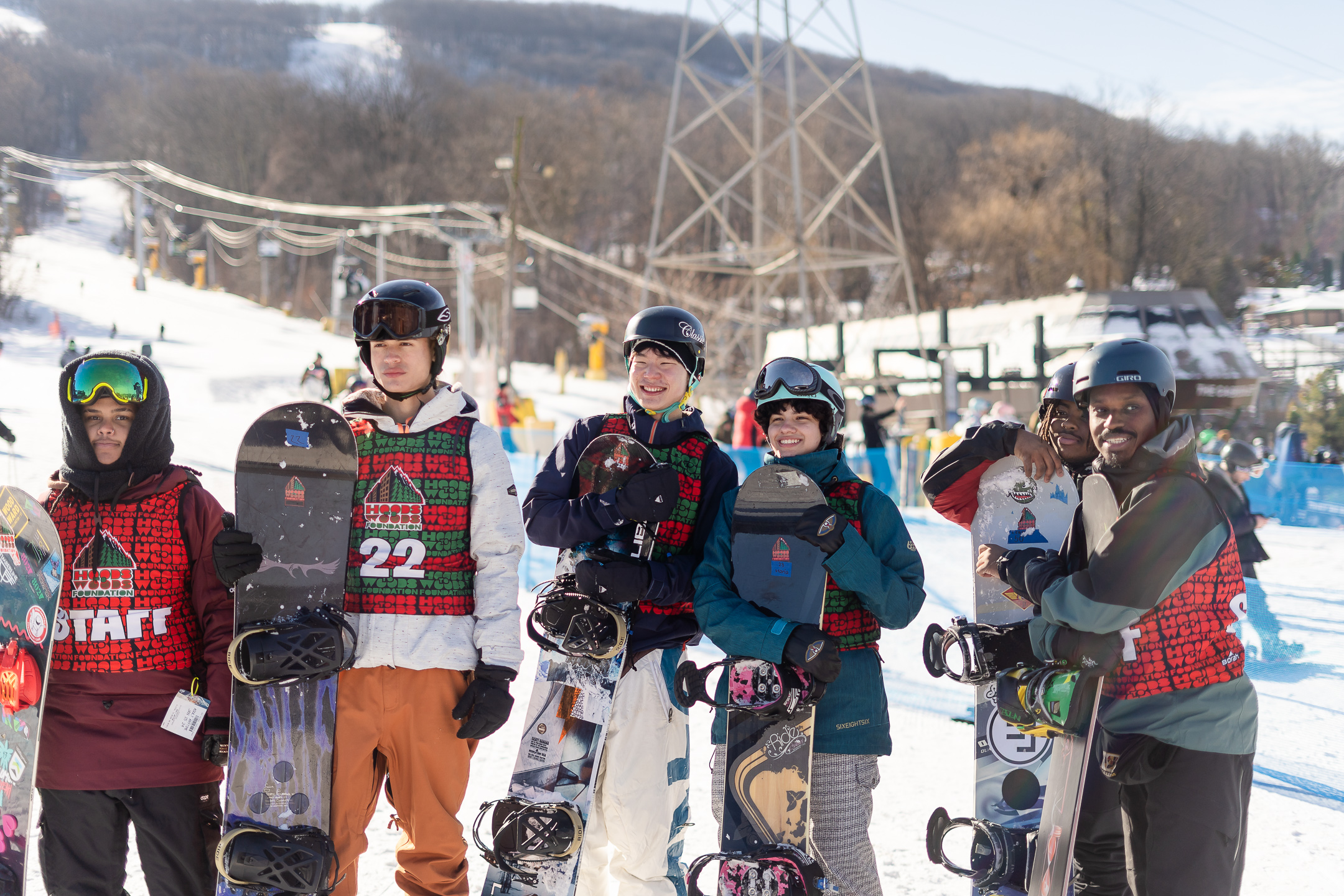
Participants and staff during a winter trip.

The foundation was started in 2009 by snowboarders Brian Paupaw and Omar Diaz, who both grew up in New York City. They began arranging small winter trips for teenagers from the city, using donated or borrowed equipment and help from volunteers. Early outings were limited in size but were enough to establish a recurring winter program that brought young participants to regional mountains.

As demand grew the organization increased the number of program days and formalized its structure, moving from occasional trips to a more regular schedule of sessions for youth from across New York City.

== Programs ==
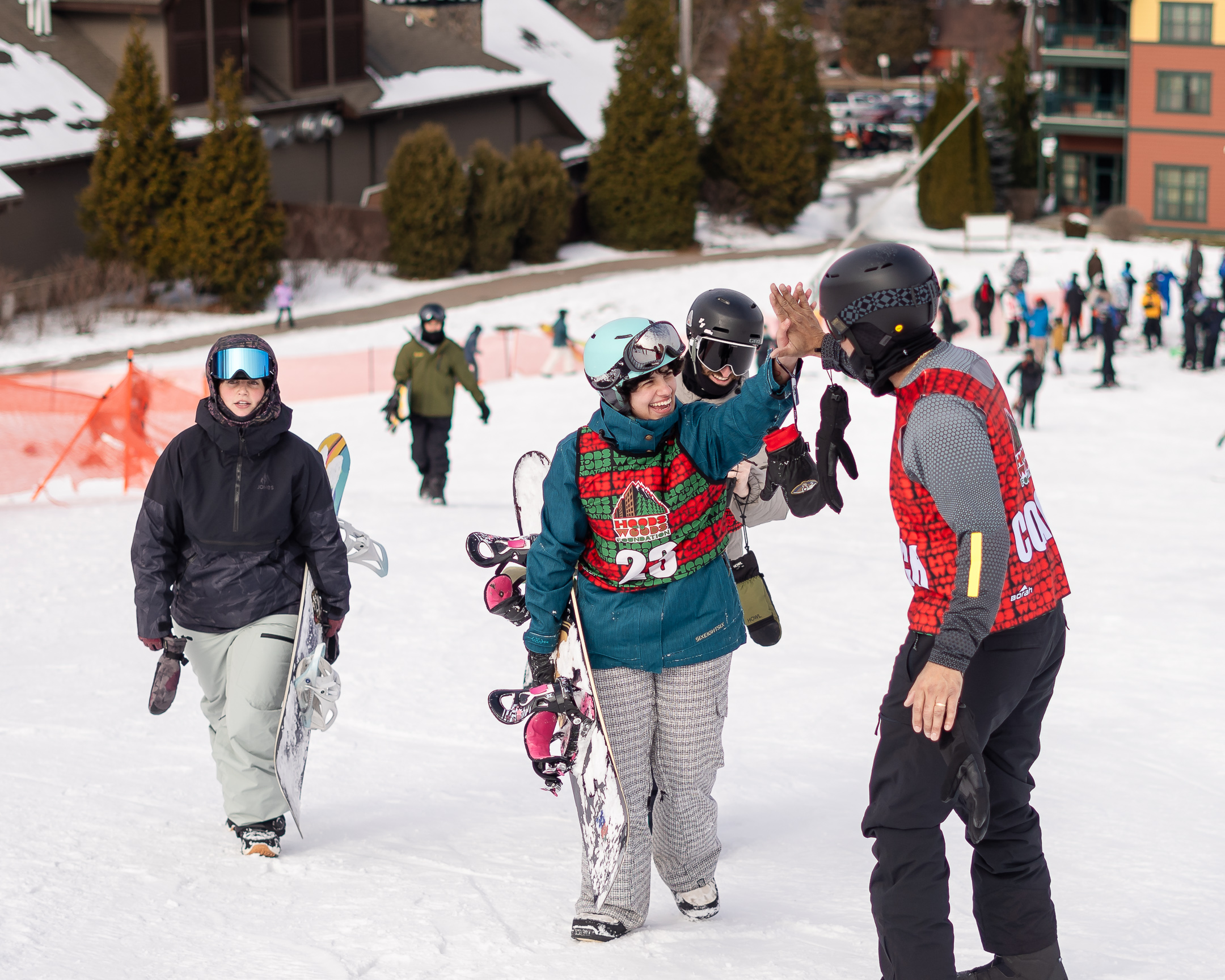
A mentor assisting a participant during a snowboarding session.

Hoods to Woods runs seasonal snowboarding programs during the winter. Participants receive transportation from the city, lift tickets, equipment and on-snow instruction at no cost. Program days take place at ski resorts in the northeastern United States and sometimes at indoor snow facilities that allow for early-season or off-season practice.

The foundation focuses on beginner and intermediate riders, with staff and volunteers helping participants with basic skills, lift riding, and mountain safety. Some past participants later return to assist as volunteers and mentors for newer riders.

The founders have expressed interest in adding hiking and other introductory outdoor activities beyond snowboarding.

== Media coverage ==
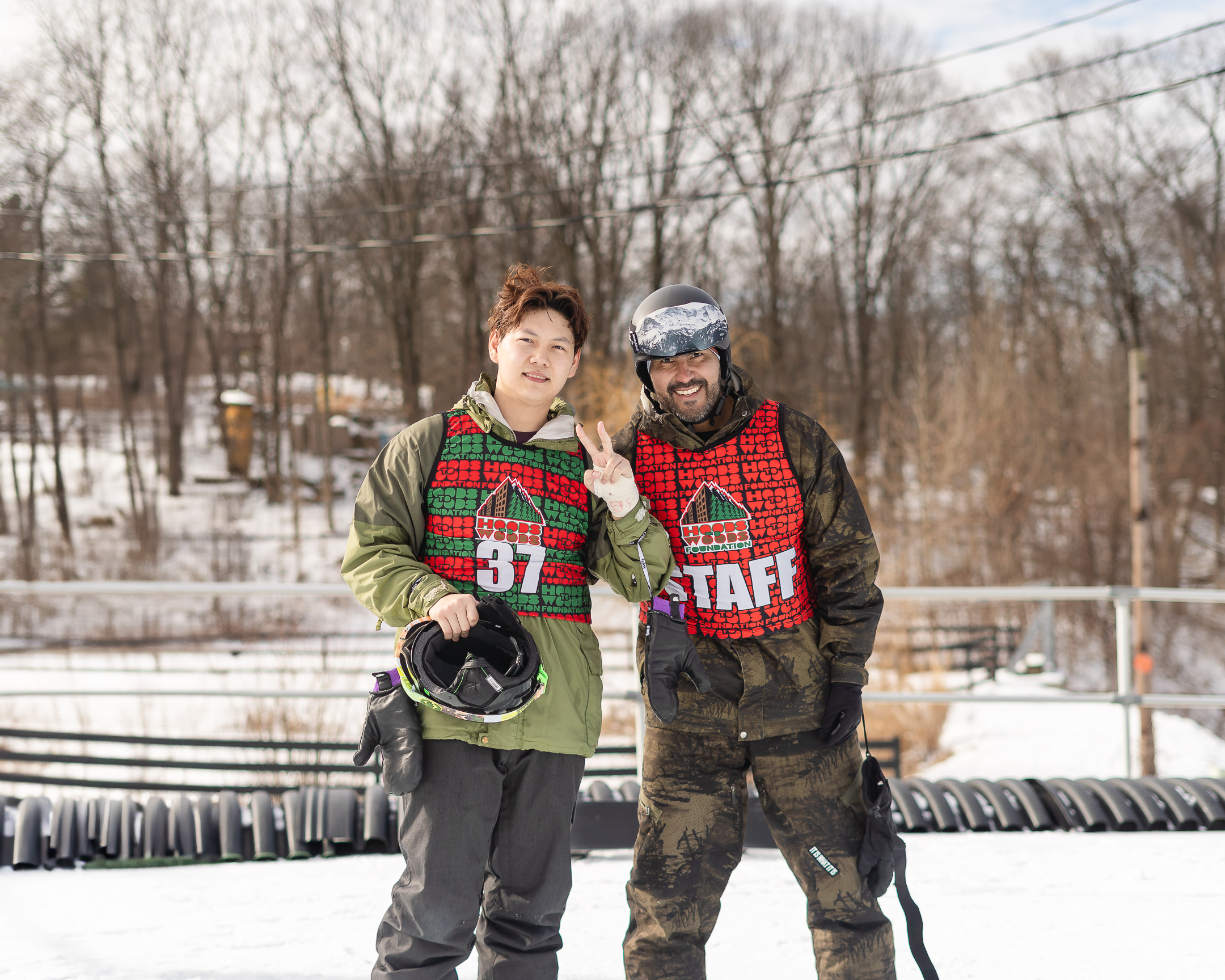
Participants during a program day.

A 2022 NPR segment on diversity in snowboarding featured Hoods to Woods and included interviews with the founders and participants. Later pieces in Snowboarder and Yahoo Lifestyle described the foundation as one of several New York City–based groups that lower cost barriers to snow sports for young people and outlined how the program organizes recurring winter sessions for its participants.

Features on the Arc'teryx website and in Snowboard International discuss the development of the organization from its early seasons to a recurring youth program and note its role in introducing first-time riders to mountain environments.

Professional snowboarder Zeb Powell has mentioned Hoods to Woods in an interview with Red Bull while talking about community programs and representation in snowboarding.

== Partnerships ==
The foundation works with outdoor brands, local supporters and ski resorts to secure equipment, transportation and lift access for its programs. These arrangements help cover program costs and allow the organization to provide instruction and equipment without charging participants.
